The men's 5000 metres T11 event at the 2020 Summer Paralympics in Tokyo took place on 27 August 2021.

Records
Prior to the competition, the existing records were as follows:

Results
The final took place at 09:35.

References

Men's 5000 metres T11
2021 in men's athletics